Blood in the Water may refer to:

 Blood in the Water match, a water polo match between Hungary and the USSR in 1956
 "Blood in the Water" (CSI: Miami), an episode of CSI: Miami
 Blood in the Water (2009 film), a made-for-TV movie
Blood in the Water (2016 film), an American thriller film
 Blood in the Water, a 2016 Discovery Channel movie starring Alex Russell
 Blood in the Water (novel), by Gillian Galbraith
 Blood in the Water, a novel in the Destroyermen series by Taylor Anderson
 Blood in the Water (book), by Heather Ann Thompson about the Attica Prison uprising of 1971
 Blood in the Water: Live in San Diego, a live DVD from Megadeth
 Blood in the Water (album), a 2021 album by Flotsam and Jetsam
 "Blood in the Water", a musical number from the musical Legally Blonde